So Far is the first compilation album from New Zealand-born Australian pop singer Sharon O'Neill. The album was released on CBS Records' budget label J&B. The album was released during a period of legal dispute between O'Neill and CBS.

Track listing
Vinyl/cassette (JB 253)

Side A
 "Losing You" (O'Neill)
 "How Do You Talk to Boys" (Steve Kipner, T Seufert)
 "Radio Lover" (O'Neill)
 "Words" (O'Neill)
 "For All the Tea in China" (O'Neill)
 "Baby Don't Fight" (O'Neill)
 "Asian Paradise" (O'Neill)	

Side B
 "Maxine" (O'Neill)
 "Street Boys" (O'Neill)
 "Danger" (O'Neill)	
 "Waiting for You" (O'Neill)
 "Luck's on Your Table" (O'Neill)
 "Any Time You Want"	(O'Neill)
 "Maybe" (O'Neill)

Charts
The album made it Kent Music Report debut in August 1986, two years after it was released.

References

1984 compilation albums
Compilation albums by Australian artists
Sharon O'Neill albums